Bicentennial Park South, currently known as Rockdale Ilinden Sports Centre, is a football (soccer) stadium in Rockdale, a suburb of Sydney in New South Wales, Australia.

The venue is owned by Bayside Council and is currently leased and operated by the Rockdale Ilinden Football Club who compete in various local competitions, along with the top tier of men's football in the state, the National Premier Leagues NSW.

The stadium was an open field prior to a redevelopment which began in October 2008 and completed with an official opening in December 2009.

History
Bicentennial Park was opened in 1988. The football ground was opened to the general public as an idle soccer pitch. The ground was used as a local training ground for football, rugby league and athletics while holding matches by a local soccer team, the Monterey Stingrays. In 2006, redevelopment plans were announced, relocating many sporting teams to Bicentennial Park and Scarborough Park grounds. The Rockdale Ilinden Football Club is a 21-year tenant of the new ground.

Re-Development
Development work begun on Bicentennial Park South in October 2008 as part of the Bicentennial and Scarborough Park Upgrade, including surface reconstruction for buildings to house change rooms and training rooms on the western hill and extended car park spaces. Stage 2 involves the installation of additional floodlights and a new grandstand seating area. The Rockdale Ilinden Football Club had originally announced the completion of the upgrade to be by March 2009 in time for the 2009 NSW Super League season, however various issues caused delays in the completion of the venue.

The stadium was eventually completed in September 2009 and was opened during the month of December, where the first football match was played with the home team Rockdale clashing with Preston Lions FC on 12 December. The first official NSW Premier League match was contested during the second round of the 2010 NSW Premier League season against fellow competition rivals Bankstown City Lions with Rockdale prevailing 1-0.

In 2017 Bayside Council has accepted a $1.5 million tender to install an artificial turf surface at its Bicentennial Park. Construction is scheduled to begin in August and be completed by the end of January, 2018. the Council will work with Rockdale City Suns Football Club and Turf One on future maintenance on the field.

Rockdale Ilinden Football Club will use Bicentennial Park South as Rockdale Ilinden Sports Centre for naming rights in football competition.

Gallery

Bicentennial Park East
Bicentennial Park East is a nearby park consisting of 3 football surfaces specifically designed for the use of junior football players. The development consisted of two large soccer fields and one small field. Cricket pitches have also been constructed in the centre of the two large fields for use in summer. Bicentennial Park East is accessible to the north and south via a footbridge, connecting senior and junior playing fields along with the main car parks. Geographically, Bicentennial Park East is located on the border of three suburbs, Monterey, Rockdale and Brighton-Le-Sands, but is officially in Brighton-Le-sands according to the Geographical Names Board of New South Wales.

References

External links
Bicentennial Park official-site at Rockdale City Suns
Rockdale City Suns Official Website
Football NSW
NSW Premier League

Soccer venues in Sydney
Sports venues in Sydney
Rockdale Ilinden FC
1988 establishments in Australia
Sports venues completed in 2009
Australian bicentennial commemorations